Jan Allan Sandström (born January 24, 1978) is a Swedish former professional ice hockey player who last played with the Luleå HF team in the Swedish Hockey League (SHL), where he has played since 2001. He was born in Luleå, but grew up in Piteå.

Sandström is known for preferring the Wrist shot technique when shooting the puck. This has earned him the nicknames Janne Wristhot and Janne the Wrister.

During the 2016–17 SHL season, Sandström surpassed David Petrasek as the player with the most career Swedish Hockey League (formerly Elitserien) games played.

Career statistics

References

External links 
 

1978 births
Living people
AIK IF players
Luleå HF players
Anaheim Ducks draft picks
People from Piteå
Piteå HC players
Skellefteå AIK players
Swedish ice hockey defencemen
People from Luleå
Sportspeople from Norrbotten County